Ezra 3 is the third chapter of the Book of Ezra in the Old Testament of the Christian Bible, or the book of Ezra-Nehemiah in the Hebrew Bible, which treats the book of Ezra and book of Nehemiah as one book. Jewish tradition states that Ezra is the author of Ezra-Nehemiah as well as the Book of Chronicles, but modern scholars generally accept that a compiler from the 5th century BCE (the so-called "Chronicler") is the final author of these books. The section comprising chapter 1 to 6 describes the history before the arrival of Ezra in the land of Judah  in 468 BCE. This chapter focuses on the people's worship and culminates in the project to rebuild the temple's foundations.

Text
The original text is written in Hebrew language. This chapter is divided into 13 verses.

Textual witnesses
Some early manuscripts containing the text of this chapter in Hebrew are of the Masoretic Text, which includes Codex Leningradensis (1008).

There is also a translation into Koine Greek known as the Septuagint, made in the last few centuries BCE. Extant ancient manuscripts of the Septuagint version include Codex Vaticanus (B; B; 4th century), and Codex Alexandrinus (A; A; 5th century).

An ancient Greek book called 1 Esdras (Greek: Ἔσδρας Αʹ) containing some parts of 2 Chronicles, Ezra and Nehemiah  is included in most editions of the Septuagint and is placed before the single book of Ezra–Nehemiah (which is titled in Greek: Ἔσδρας Βʹ). 1 Esdras 5:47-65 is an equivalent of Ezra 3 (Feast of Tabernacles).

The Altar (3:1–6)
Before reestablishing legitimate worship at the temple, which still needed to be rebuilt, the people repaired the altar and performed the sacrifices according to the Torah.

Verse 1
And when the seventh month was come, and the children of Israel were in the cities, the people gathered themselves together as one man to Jerusalem.
Three central feasts are celebrated in the seventh month, making it the “preeminent month” in the calendar. The seventh month of the first year of the return of the exiles corresponds to September/October 537 BC.

Verse 2
Then Jeshua the son of Jozadak and his brethren the priests, and Zerubbabel the son of Shealtiel and his brethren, arose and built the altar of the God of Israel, to offer burnt offerings on it, as it is written in the Law of Moses the man of God.
"Jeshua": or "Joshua". His office is not named in this book, but he is identified as the "high priest" in Haggai 1:1, ; ; .
"Jozadak": or "Jehozadak".
"Zerubbabel": is the leader of the group and of Davidic line, so he is associated with the messianic hope in the book of Zechariah, although none of it is mentioned in this book.  His office is not named in this book, but he is identified as the "governor of Judah" in Haggai 1:1, ; .

Verse 3
Though fear had come upon them because of the people of those countries, they set the altar on its bases; and they offered burnt offerings on it to the Lord, both the morning and evening burnt offerings.

The Temple (3:7–13)

After reintroduced worship at the former site of altar (in Solomon's Temple), the building of a new temple is initiated. Both the building of the altar and the foundation of the temple showed similarities to the one of the first temple, such as the importation of cedars from Lebanon and the start of the project in the second month (which could be the appropriate time in early spring; cf. ). When the foundation of temple was laid, the people responded in different ways: the older ones who had seen the first temple wept loudly, while the younger ones gave a great shout of praise to God.

Verse 7
They gave money to the masons and carpenters, and food, drink, and oil to the people of Sidon and to the people of Tyre so that they would bring cedar trees from Lebanon to the sea, at Joppa, according to the grant they had from Cyrus king of Persia.
The laborers and materials for the temple came from Sidon and Tyre in Lebanon, closely repeating those of the Solomon's temple.

Verse 10
And when the builders laid the foundation of the temple of the Lord, they set the priests in their apparel with trumpets, and the Levites the sons of Asaph with cymbals, to praise the Lord, after the ordinance of David king of Israel.
"They set the priests" or "they stationed the priests" according to the Masoretic Text, whereas LXX, Syriac Peshitta and Latin Vulgate render it "the priests stood".
"Ordinance": lit.

Verse 11
And they sang responsively, praising and giving thanks to the Lord:
"For He is good,
For His mercy endures forever toward Israel."
Then all the people shouted with a great shout, when they praised the Lord, because the foundation of the house of the Lord was laid.
The same song was sung at the dedication of the first temple (Solomon's temple) over four centuries earlier.

See also
Jerusalem
Joppa
Sukkot
Related Bible parts: Ezra 2, Haggai 2

Notes

References

Sources

External links
 Jewish translations:
 Ezra - Chapter 3 (Judaica Press) translation [with Rashi's commentary] at Chabad.org
 Christian translations:
 Online Bible at GospelHall.org (ESV, KJV, Darby, American Standard Version, Bible in Basic English)
 Book of Ezra Chapter 3. Bible Gateway

03
Phoenicians in the Hebrew Bible